This is a list of combat shotguns: shotguns that have been designed for use in warfare, and have been used by law enforcement or military units.

The table is sortable for every column.

Shotguns

See also 
 Pump action
 Automatic shotgun
 Combat shotgun
 List of individual weapons of the U.S. Armed Forces
 List of shotguns
 Riot shotgun
 Semi-automatic shotgun

References